Scheff is a surname. Notable people with the surname include:

Fritzi Scheff, American actress
Jason Scheff, American musician
Jerry Scheff, American musician
Otto Scheff, Austrian freestyle swimmer
Thomas J. Scheff, American educator
Werner Scheff (1888–1947), German writer and screenwriter

See also
Scheff., taxonomic author abbreviation for Rudolph Scheffer (1844–1880), Dutch botanist